Pilar von Carsten (born 11 October 1947) is a Spanish former swimmer. She competed in the women's 200 metre individual medley at the 1968 Summer Olympics.

References

External links
 

1947 births
Living people
Olympic swimmers of Spain
Swimmers at the 1968 Summer Olympics
Swimmers from Madrid
Spanish female medley swimmers